Alexis Maridor (July 15, 1848 – 1909) was a French-speaking Swiss writer and publisher.

Life 

Maridor was born in Fenin in the canton of Neuchâtel.

He was editor of the radical political journal , and in 1889 was elected to the grand council of La Chaux-de-Fonds, on the radical party list.

In 1899 his publishing house A. Maridor, located in La Chaux-de-Fonds, was liquidated.

Maridor died in Paris in 1909.

Works (selection)

 La Récréation. Journal littéraire hebdomadaire. 1869.
 Le colonel (Jules) Philippin. Esquisse biographique par Alexis Maridor, Rédacteur du National Suisse. Suivie des Mémoires du colonel (autobiographie) rédigés par lui-même en 1881-1882, (avec son portrait). 1883.
 La Muse romande. Première année, 1890–1891. Avec pröface de Virgile Rossel. Zahn, La Chaux-de-Fonds 1891.
 Quelques notes sur la future organisation de l'établissement des jeunes garçons projeté à La Chaux-de-Fonds. Conseil général, La Chaux-de-Fonds 1891, .
 Le colonel Philippin. Esquisse biographique suivie des mémoires du colonel. 1893.
 mit E. Doutrebande: La Muse romande. Deuxième année, 1890–1893. Mit einem Vorwort von Henry Warnery. La Chaux-de-Fonds 1893.
 Nos fêtes. 1894–1897.
 Maître Brosse. Roman de mœurs suisses. Maridor, La Chaux-de-Fonds 1897, .

Editing of periodicals 

 La Récréation : journal littéraire hebdomadaire. 1869
 La Muse romande. 1890-1893
 Nos fêtes. 1894-1897

See also 
 Swiss literature

Notes and references

External links
 

1848 births
1909 deaths
Swiss writers